Mecistophylla agramma is a species of snout moth in the genus Mecistophylla. It was described by Oswald Bertram Lower in 1903 and is known from the Australian state of Queensland and the Louisiade Archipelago.

References

Moths described in 1903
Tirathabini